Giallo is a 1933 Italian comedy thriller film directed by Mario Camerini and starring Assia Noris, Sandro Ruffini and Elio Steiner. It is based on the 1928 play The Man Who Changed His Name by Edgar Wallace in which a young wife begins to fear that her husband may in fact be an escaped murderer.

It was made to capitalise on the growing popularity in Italy of Giallo, mystery and thriller fiction notable for their yellow covers and melodramatic plots often written by Anglo-American writers. It is also considered an early precursor of the successful Italian Giallo film genre, which boomed after the Second World War.

The film's sets were designed by the art director Gastone Medin. It was shot at the Cines Studios in Rome.

Cast
 Assia Noris as Henriette 
 Sandro Ruffini as Giorgio - suo marito 
 Elio Steiner as Il conte Amati 
 Giulio Gemmò as Carlo - l'avvocato 
 Carlo Ranieri as Il vecchio professore 
 Aronne Limardi as Il guardacaccia 
 Carlo Lombardi as Alessio - attore 
 Vanda Barbini as L'attrice 
 Luigi Erminio D'Olivo as Invitato alla festa

References

Bibliography 
 Moliterno, Gino. The A to Z of Italian Cinema. Scarecrow Press, 2009.

External links 
 

1930s comedy thriller films
Italian comedy thriller films
1933 films
1930s Italian-language films
Films directed by Mario Camerini
Italian black-and-white films
Cines Studios films
Films based on works by Edgar Wallace
1933 comedy films
1930s Italian films